William Binford Crew (April 1, 1852 – January 25, 1911) was a Republican politician in the U.S. State of Ohio who was in the Ohio House of Representatives, and a judge on the Ohio Supreme Court 1902–1911.

William B. Crew was born at Chesterhill, Morgan County, Ohio, and educated in the public schools and at Westtown College in Pennsylvania, (a college under management of the Society of Friends). He was admitted to the bar of Ohio in 1873.

Crew graduated from the Ohio State and Union Law College, Cleveland, Ohio, in 1874, and was elected Prosecuting Attorney of Morgan County in 1876. He was elected to represent his county in the Ohio House of Representatives in 1889, serving in the 79th General Assembly, 1890–1891.

Crew was elected a judge of the Court of Common Pleas for the 1st Subdivision of the 8th judicial district of Ohio in 1891, and re-elected in 1896 and 1901. At the Republican State Convention in May 1902, he was Nominated for Judge of the Supreme Court. Governor Nash appointed Crew to fill the vacancy on the court caused by the death of Marshall Jay Williams, effective July 19, 1902. He was elected to a term in November 1902, and served as judge until January 1, 1911.

Judge Crew died January 25, 1912, at a hotel in Marietta, Ohio. He is buried in McConnelsville, Ohio.

In 1876, Crew married Elizabeth P. Worrall of Morgan County. They had two children.

References

People from Morgan County, Ohio
1852 births
Justices of the Ohio Supreme Court
Ohio lawyers
County district attorneys in Ohio
Republican Party members of the Ohio House of Representatives
1911 deaths
19th-century American judges
19th-century American lawyers